The Cutting was an automobile manufactured in Jackson, Michigan by the Clark-Carter Automobile Company from 1909–1911, and the Cutting Motor Car Company from 1911–12.  The Cutting was a powerful automobile using engines from Milwaukee, Model, and Wisconsin ranging from 30–60 hp.  Cuttings have been entered into the Indianapolis 500 in 1911 and 1912.  Prices ranged from $1,200 to $1,500.  The company failed in 1912 due to lack of sufficient capital.

References
 

Defunct motor vehicle manufacturers of the United States
Motor vehicle manufacturers based in Michigan
Defunct manufacturing companies based in Michigan